Jarl Omholt-Jensen (born 5 June 1947 in Oslo, Norway) is a Canadian former cross-country skier who competed in the 1972 Winter Olympics.

Early life
Jarl Omholt-Jensen was born on 5 June 1947 in Oslo, Norway.

References

External links
 

1947 births
Living people
Canadian male cross-country skiers
Olympic cross-country skiers of Canada
Cross-country skiers at the 1972 Winter Olympics
Norwegian emigrants to Canada
Skiers from Oslo